Dmitri Nikolayevich Smirnov (born 9 November 1980) is a Russian former footballer. He is not related to Dmitry Alexandrovich Smirnov with whom he played on the same team for several years for FC Torpedo-ZIL Moscow, Luch and Tom. To avoid confusion, he is usually referred to as Dmitri N. Smirnov.

External links
  Player page on the official Luch website
 

Russian footballers
Living people
1980 births
FC Moscow players
FC Fakel Voronezh players
FC Luch Vladivostok players
FC Khimki players
FC Tom Tomsk players
FC Torpedo Moscow players
Russian Premier League players
Footballers from Moscow
Association football midfielders
Association football defenders